The first season of The Voice, the Australian reality talent show, premiered on 15 April 2012 and concluded on 18 June 2012, with Karise Eden being crowned as the winner.

Coaches and hosts

On 29 May 2011, it was reported in The Daily Telegraph that the Nine Network would broadcast The Voice in late 2011. However, two months later, they reported that the show would now air in early 2012, and that the Nine Network were in talks with signing at least one international artist (especially an American) to lead its panel of coaches on the show, which were rumoured to be Christina Aguilera, George Michael, Usher, Pink and Gwen Stefani. In September 2011, the Herald Sun reported that the Nine Network were planning to sign Australia's Got Talent judge Dannii Minogue as one of the coaches. Anthony Callea, Vanessa Amorosi and former Pussycat Dolls member Ashley Roberts all publicly expressed interest in coaching roles, however Delta Goodrem, Keith Urban, Seal and Joel Madden were ultimately confirmed as the four coaches for the first season.

Additionally, Ricki-Lee Coulter (with Seal), Darren Hayes (Goodrem), Megan Washington (Urban) and Benji Madden (with brother Joel) paired up with the coaches as mentors for their contestants.

Darren McMullen was announced as the host of the program in January 2012. Faustina Agolley was announced as the social media correspondent during the live shows in May 2012.

Teams
Color key

Blind auditions

Filming for the blind auditions stage of the competition began on 19 February 2012 at Fox Studios in Sydney, with 121 artists featured in this phase of the selection process. The first day of filming resulted in hundreds of audience members being turned away from the studio due to overbooking of the event by an external booking agent.

Episode 1 (15 April)
The first episode of the Blind Auditions was broadcast on 15 April 2012.

Karise Eden (No.41) debuted on the ARIA Charts after her performance.

Episode 2 (16 April)
The second episode of the Blind Auditions was broadcast on 16 April 2012.

Rachael Leahcar (No.18) debuted on the ARIA Charts after her performance.

Episode 3 (17 April)
The third episode of the Blind Auditions was broadcast on 17 April 2012.

Lakyn Heperi (No.29) debuted on the ARIA Charts after his performance.

Episode 4 (22 April)
The fourth episode of the Blind Auditions was broadcast on 22 April 2012.

Episode 5 (23 April)
The fifth episode of the Blind Auditions was broadcast on 23 April 2012.

Episode 6 (24 April)
The sixth and final episode of the Blind Auditions was broadcast on 24 April 2012.

Battle rounds
Filming for the battle rounds started in late March 2012.

Episode 1 (30 April)
The first episode of the Battle Rounds was broadcast on 30 April 2012.

Key
 Battle Winner
 Eliminated Artist

Coaches' performance

Episode 2 (1 May)
The second episode of the Battle Rounds was broadcast on 1 May 2012.

Key
 Battle Winner
 Eliminated Artist

Lakyn Heperi debuted on the ARIA Charts at #10 after his performance.

Episode 3 (7 May)
The third and final episode of the Battle Rounds was broadcast on 7 May 2012.

Key
 Battle Winner
 Eliminated Artist

Ben Bennett (No.93) debuted on the ARIA Charts after his performance.

Live shows

Week 1 (14 May)
 Original broadcast date: 14 May 2012
 Coaches' performance: "Sing" with Top 24 contestants

 Notes
 Karise Eden (chart position 9), Rachael Leahcar (15), Viktoria Bolonina (28), Emma Birdsall (36) and Fatai V (43) all debuted on the ARIA Charts after their performances.

Week 2 (21 May)
 Original broadcast date: 21 May 2012

 Notes
 Brittany Cairns (chart position 7), Darren Percival (12), Sarah De Bono (13), Diana Rouvas (22), Lakyn Heperi (26) and Ben Hazlewood (35) all debuted on the ARIA Charts after their performances.
 Team Joel contestant Carmen Smith was disqualified from the competition before the live show. To keep the teams even, Team Joel only eliminated one contestant in the first live round while the other teams still eliminated two.

Week 3 (28 May)
 Original broadcast date: 28 May 2012
 Group performances:
 Delta and her team (Glenn Cunningham, Rachael Leahcar, Viktoria Bolonina, Danni Da Ros) – "Born to Try"
 Seal and his team (Chris Sebastian, Emma Birdsall, Fatai V, Karise Eden) – "Kiss From a Rose"

 Notes
 Karise Eden (chart position 14), Fatai V (25) and Rachael Leahcar (41) all debuted on the ARIA Charts in the week after their performances.
 Due to a pre-organised concert tour in Los Angeles, Keith Urban was absent during the episode but was still present via live video.

Week 4 (4 June)
The fourth episode of the Live Shows, the Quarter-Finals, was broadcast on 4 June 2012.

Competition Performances

Group performances

Darren Percival (No. 6), Diana Rouvas (No. 16), Ben Hazlewood (No. 17), Sarah De Bono (No. 24), Adam Martin (No. 26) and Lakyn Heperi (No. 39) all debuted on the ARIA Charts in the week after their performances.

Week 5 (11 June)
The fifth episode of the Live Shows, the Semi-Finals, was broadcast on 11 June 2012.

Competition Performances

Karise Eden (No. 2), Sarah De Bono (No. 30), Darren Percival (No. 36) and Rachael Leahcar (No. 43) all debuted on the ARIA Charts in the week after their performances.

Week 6: Final (17 June)
The sixth and seventh episodes of the Live Shows, parts one and two of the Live Finale of The Voice Australia, were broadcast on 17 June 2012 and 18 June 2012 consecutively. In part two of the Live Finale, Karise Eden was announced as the winner and won a recording contract with Universal Music Group, a Ford Focus Titanium and a A$100,000 cash prize. Darren Percival was runner-up, finishing in second place, winning a cash prize of A$30,000. Rachael Leahcar came in third place, winning a cash prize of A$20,000 while Sarah De Bono placed fourth, winning a cash prize of A$10,000 .

Key
 Winner
 Runner-up
 Third place
 Fourth place

Competition performances

Coach and Group performances

Specials

Voices Reaching Out
The Nine Network announced on 3 July 2012 that a one-off charity concert special, Voices Reaching Out, for The Reach Foundation would be aired. The special was staged at The Palms at Crown complex and hosted by The Voice host Darren McMullen. It featured all four finalists, Karise Eden, Darren Percival, Rachael Leahcar and Sarah De Bono. Contestants Prinnie Stevens, Mahalia Barnes, Adam Martin, Ben Hazlewood, Chris Sebastian, Fatai V, Mitchell Johnson, Brittany Cairns, Kelsie Rimmer, Diana Rouvas, Viktoria Bolonina, Emma Birdsall and Casey Withoos also performed. Singer and Team Keith mentor Megan Washington also performed. Also appearing was The Voice social media correspondent Faustina Agolley, joined by Jules Lund and Jesinta Campbell. The 90-minute concert was filmed 12 July 2012 and aired 15 July 2012 on the Nine Network.

Performances

Elimination Chart

Overall
Artist's info

Result details

Artist's info

Result details

Reception

Ratings
 Colour key:
  Highest rating during the season
  Lowest rating during the season

Notes

References

External links

 Official website

2012 Australian television series debuts
2012 Australian television seasons
1